Subhash Bhowmick (2 October 1950 – 22 January 2022) was an Indian football player and manager. During his playing career, he represented the "Big Two" of Kolkata football, East Bengal and Mohun Bagan. He also represented India in various international tournaments between 1970 and 1985. He was popularly known as Bhombol in the football arena of the West Bengal.

Club career
Bhowmick joined East Bengal Club in 1969 and, after spending a season there, joined Mohun Bagan in 1970. He was part of the club's Bangladesh tour of May 1972, where they defeated Dhaka Mohammedan, but lost to Shadhin Bangla football team. At the end of the 1973 season, he returned to East Bengal and represented them till 1976, after which he rejoined Mohun Bagan. In East Bengal, he got guidance of legendary coach Sushil Bhattacharya.

He was one of the prime faces of East Bengal team which had demolished Mohun Bagan 5–0 in the 1975 IFA Shield final at Calcutta. After the 1977–78 season, he returned to East Bengal and retired in 1979. During his playing years, he was known as a powerful forward with good goal scoring abilities. He scored 83 goals for East Bengal and 82 for the Mohun Bagan between 1969 to 1977 as Kolkata football's popularity was at its peak during that era.

International career
Bhowmick represented India in various tournaments. He was a member of the Indian football team managed by P. K. Banerjee, that won the Bronze medal in the Asian Games in 1970. in Bangkok, Thailand. He also represented India at the Merdeka Tournament, and won Pesta Sukan Cup in 1971.

Coaching career

Bhowmick began his coaching career in Calcutta Football League club George Telegraph. Since joining East Bengal in 1999, he came out as one of the most successful coaches in the history of the club. He had a forgettable first stint with the same club during the 1999–2000 season. During his second stint as coach, the club won a multitude of trophies including back to back NFL titles in 2002–03 and 2003–04, apart from Kolkata Football League, Durand Cup and IFA Shield victories. East Bengal also won the ASEAN Club Championship in Indonesia in 2003 under his managership. Bhowmick stepped down as coach of East Bengal in 2005 after being implicated in an alleged bribery scandal.

He managed Mohammedan Sporting Club during the 2006 season, but was not as successful there as he was during his stint with East Bengal. In 2007, a relegation threatened Salgaocar SC appointed Subhash Bhowmick to be their technical director. He remained as the Technical Director of the Goan outfit for the 2008 season also. Towards the end of the 2008–09 I-League, a relegation threatened East Bengal Club appointed Bhowmick as their coach. He was retained as coach for the 2009–10 season, a particularly dismal season for the club. East Bengal lost all the matches they played, most of them against smaller clubs, in both the IFA Shield as well as the Durand Cup. Supporters and club officials fixed the blame squarely on Bhowmick, as he was essentially the only man responsible for team making and pre-season training for the 2009–10 season. Despite significant autonomy granted to Bhowmick by East Bengal administrators, as well as provision of extra training facilities, his team failed to perform.

In the 2012–13 season, he coached Goan side Churchill Brothers SC as a technical director (as he did not hold an A-license, hence he could not officially be the coach of an I-League club), and led them to the top of the league standings in the I-League.

Controversy
On 2 December 2005, near Calcutta South Club, Bhowmick was caught red handed and arrested by the police for bribery case. Bhowmick was a superintend of Central Excise and alleged to have accepted bribe of Rs 1.5 lakh from a businessman. According to the Central Bureau of Investigation (CBI), he had demanded the money from a Behala based businessman to settle his issue. In June 2018, the CBI Court found him guilty and sentenced Bhowmick to three years imprisonment. His career was also marred after the Corruption controversy.

Death
Bhowmick died in Ekbalpur on 22 January 2022, at the age of 71. He suffered from diabetes and kidney ailments prior to his death.

Legacy
In July 2022, Mohun Bagan announced the club awards have been named after famous personalities to be awarded to sportspersons every year henceforth, and "Best Forward Award" was renamed as Subhash Bhowmick Award in memory of him; which was won by Kiyan Nassiri.

Honours

As player
India
Asian Games Bronze medal: 1970
Merdeka Tournament Third place: 1970
Pesta Sukan Cup: 1971

Bengal
Santosh Trophy: 1969, 1971, 1972, 1975

East Bengal
Calcutta Football League: 1973, 1974, 1975
IFA Shield: 1973, 1974, 1975
Rovers Cup: 1969, 1970, 1971, 1972, 1973
DCM Trophy: 1973, 1974

Mohun Bagan
Calcutta Football League: 1976, 1978
IFA Shield: 1976, 1977, 1978
Durand Cup: 1977
Indian Federation Cup: 1978
Rovers Cup: 1975, 1976, 1977
Bordoloi Trophy: 1976, 1977
Darjeeling Gold Cup: 1976
Sait Nagjee Trophy: 1978

As manager
East Bengal
ASEAN Club Championship: 2003
National Football League: 2002–03, 2003–04
San Miguel International Cup: 2004
Indian Super Cup: 2006
Durand Cup: 2002, 2004
IFA Shield: 2000, 2001, 2002
Calcutta Football League: 2000, 2002, 2003, 2004, 2006
Churchill Brothers
I-League: 2012–13

Individual
 East Bengal "Lifetime Achievement Award": 2017

See also 

 List of India national football team hat-tricks
 List of East Bengal Club coaches

References

Bibliography

Chattopadhyay, Hariprasad (2017). Mohun Bagan–East Bengal . Kolkata: Parul Prakashan.

External links
International goals by Subhash Bhowmick at RSSSF
Interview of Subhash Bhowmick at The Telegraph

1950 births
2022 deaths
Indian footballers
India international footballers
Footballers from West Bengal
Indian football coaches
Indian football managers
People from Malda district
I-League managers
East Bengal Club managers
Asian Games medalists in football
Footballers at the 1970 Asian Games
Footballers at the 1974 Asian Games
Association football forwards
Asian Games bronze medalists for India
Medalists at the 1970 Asian Games
Calcutta Football League players
Mohammedan SC (Kolkata) managers
Mohun Bagan AC managers
Deaths from kidney disease
Deaths from diabetes